Russell "Russ" Emanuel is an American director, producer, and independent filmmaker.

Emanuel founded Russem Productions, a Los Angeles based production company in 2002, through which he has produced and directed short and feature-length films.

Early life

Emanuel was born in San Francisco, California and grew up in both Japan and the United States.

Emanuel attended the University of Southern California in Los Angeles with an emphasis in film studies, international relations, and Japanese.

Films

Emanuel's first films were shorts, including Her Knight (2003) and Girl with Gun (2006). In 2007, Emanuel produced his first feature film, P.J.. Emanuel subsequently directed the feature film Chasing the Green (2009), starring William Devane, and The Legends of Nethiah (2012) starring John Heard and Robert Picardo. His 2015 horror feature film Occupants, also starring Picardo, screened at film festivals including Shriekfest 2016.

Documentaries
Emanuel directed and produced the documentary film Restoration of Paradise (2014), about the history of the Bolsa Chica wetlands, which has at different times been a Native American settlement, President Teddy Roosevelt's Gun Club, and a World War II home for artillery batteries. The documentary was narrated by Robert Picardo.

Filmography

Awards

Action on Film International Film Festival
 (2015) – Best Cinematography Documentary / Restoration of Paradise (2014)
 (2018) – Best Spoof / The Meeting: Webisode III - A Not So Funny Meeting (2018)

Bare Bones International Film Festival
 (2018) Best Feature Thriller / Occupants (2015)
 (2019) Ned Hockman’s Best Bare Bones Director Award / The Assassin's Apprentice (2018)
 (2020) Best Thriller: First Place / American Wisper (2019)
 (2021) Micro-Short: Best Covid-Pandemic Film / Routine (2020)

Boston Science Fiction Film Festival
 (2017) Best Found Footage / Occupants (2015)

Canada International Film Festival
 (2010) Award for Excellence in Feature Film Competition / Chasing the Green (2009)

Hollywood Reel Independent Film Festival
 (2016) Best Trailer / Occupants (2015)
 (2023) People's Choice Award: Best Short Genre Film / The Assassin's Apprentice 2: Silbadores of the Canary Islands (2022)
 (2023) Best Trailer / Staycation (2023)

Idyllwild International Festival of Cinema
 (2017) Excellence in Filmmaking / Occupants (2015)
 (2018) Excellence in Filmmaking / Collar (2017)
 (2019) Marshall Hawkins Best Original Score Short / The Assassin's Apprentice (2018)

New Jersey Film Festival
 (2008) Grand Prize for Best Feature Film/Video / P.J. (2008)

Philadelphia Independent Film Festival
 (2017) Best Sci-Fi Feature / Occupants (2015)

Shriekfest
 (2016) Best Sci-Fi Feature / Occupants (2015)

WorldFest-Houston International Film Festival
 (2012) Silver Award for Independent Theatrical Feature Films - Family/Children / The Legends of Nethiah (2012)
 (2018) Special Jury Award: Suspense/Thriller, Platinum Award: Dramatic - Original / Collar (2017)
 (2021) Silver Remi: Shorts - Fantasy/Horror / Routine (2020)
 (2022) Silver Remi: Short Film Productions – Use of Drones / The Assassin's Apprentice (2018)

References

External links
 
 
 The Official Russem Productions website

American directors
Living people
American filmmakers
University of Southern California alumni
Year of birth missing (living people)